The Metropolitan Borough of Fulham was a Metropolitan borough in the County of London between 1900 and 1965, when it was merged with the Metropolitan Borough of Hammersmith to form the London Borough of Hammersmith and Fulham. It was a riverside borough, and comprised the many centuries-long definition of Fulham so included parts often considered of independent character today Walham Green, Parsons Green, Hurlingham, Sands End and that part of Chelsea Harbour west of Counter's Creek. The SW6 postal district approximately follows this as does the direct, though less empowered, predecessor Fulham civil parish.

Coat of arms

When the metropolitan borough was formed it carried on using the unofficial arms adopted by its predecessor, Fulham vestry in 1886. This was a quartered shield, with a depiction of a bridge in the first and fourth quarters. The bridge in the first quarter was the original wooden Putney Bridge, opened in 1729 with its toll houses. Its replacement, the present Putney Bridge, constructed of stone, was shown in the fourth quarter. The new bridge was opened in 1886, when the arms were designed. The second quarter showed crossed swords, from the arms of the Bishop of London. The manor of Fulham was held by the bishop from 691, and his official residence, Fulham Palace, was built in the area. The third quarter was the arms then associated with the county of Middlesex, in which Fulham lay until 1889. The three seaxes on a red field was also regarded as the arms of Essex.

In 1927 councillor F. H. Barber, proprietor of Barber's Department Store in the borough, offered to pay the 
costs of a grant of arms and new civic regalia. Accordingly, an official grant was obtained from the College of Arms
on 12 October of that year, blazoned as follows:
Barry wavy of ten, Argent and azure, on a Saltire gules, two swords in Saltire points upwards of the first enfiled of a Mitre Or, and for the Crest upon a Mural Crown of Seven turrets Or and Ancient Rowing Ship in full sail Sable, the Flags per fesse Argent and Azure charged on the sail with a Rose Gules, surmounted by a Rose Argent barbed Vert and seeded proper.
The silver and blue wavy field was for the River Thames, the swords and mitre signifying the Bishop of London.

The crest rose from a gold mural crown, resembling a city wall, and thus municipal government. The crest itself was 
a black ship, recalling an expedition to Fulham by the Danes in 879. The main sail was charged with a Tudor rose, recalling the importance of the area in that era, when Fulham Palace was rebuilt.

The Latin motto, Pro Civibus Et Civitate, was translated as "for citizens and state".

The waves from the shield, the two swords, the mitre and most of the crest was brought to the coat of arms of the London Borough of Hammersmith and Fulham when Fulham and Hammersmith merged to form a new London borough in 1965.

Population and area
The population, as recorded at the census, was:

Fulham Vestry 1801-1899

Metropolitan Borough 1900–1961
{| class="wikitable" 
! Year
|| 1901||1911 || 1921 || 1931 || 1941 || 1951 || 1961 
|-
! Population|| 137,289 || 153,284 || 157,938 || 150,928 ||<ref>The census was suspended for World War II</ref>|| 122,064 || 111,791
|}

Town Hall
The borough was administered from Fulham Town Hall, on Fulham Broadway, in Walham Green. The hall had been built in 1888 – 1890 for the Fulham vestry, and was in the classical renaissance'' style. When the London Borough of Hammersmith and Fulham was formed, Hammersmith Town Hall was adopted as the administrative centre. Some offices remain at Fulham however, and contains a registry office. The grand hall is a popular venue for concerts and dances. The london borough council also makes the building available for filming purposes.

Politics

Under the Metropolis Management Act 1855 any parish that exceeded 2,000 ratepayers was to be divided into wards; however the parish of Fulham did not exceed this number so was not divided into wards.

In 1883-84 the population had increased enough for the parish to be divided into three wards (electing vestrymen): North End (27), Walham (27) and South Fulham (18).

In 1894 as its population had increased the newly incorporated vestry was re-divided into eight wards (electing vestrymen): Baron's Court (12), Margravine (9), Munster (9), Lillie (12), Walham (12), Town (6), Hurlingham (3) and Sands End (9).

The metropolitan borough was divided into eight wards for elections: Baron's Court, Hurlingham, Lillie, Margravine, Munster, Sands End, Town, and Walham.

Borough council

Parliament constituency
For elections to Parliament, the borough for 18 years amounted to one seat:
Fulham
In 1918 such representation was increased to two seats:
Fulham East
Fulham West
In 1955 such representation was reduced to  seats. The half seat shared was with part of the Metropolitan Borough of Hammersmith and was named:
Barons Court
The other seat was:
Fulham (reduced period of the seat mentioned in the bullet point above)

References

Further reading
 

Metropolitan boroughs of the County of London
History of the London Borough of Hammersmith and Fulham
1900 establishments in the United Kingdom
1965 disestablishments in the United Kingdom
Districts abolished by the London Government Act 1963
Metropolitan Borough of